The Surveyor General of Victoria is the person nominally responsible for government surveying in Victoria, Australia. The original duties for the Surveyor General was to measure and determine land grants for settlers in Victoria. The position was created at the time Victoria became a separate colony in 1851 (see History of Victoria).

The Surveyor-General of Victoria is the primary government authority on surveying and the cadastre (land property boundaries and tenure).

The Surveying Act 2004, Act 47/2004, Part 6, specifies the appointment, suspension and functions of the Surveyor-General. Note that the act spells "Surveyor-General" with hyphen, which is the conventional spelling.

List of Surveyors General of Victoria

References

Sources
Lists of British, Australian and New Zealand Surveyors-General, Government Geologists... Retrieved 5 September 2016
Australian Dictionary of Biography Surveyor-General search Retrieved 14 June 2012